Satpal Raizada is an Indian politician from the Indian National Congress and a  member of the Himachal Pradesh Legislative Assembly representing the Una assembly constituency of Himachal Pradesh.
He defeated his long time political rival Satpal Singh Satti who was BJP state President and 3 time Sitting MLA by 3196 votes.

References 

Year of birth missing (living people)
Living people
Himachal Pradesh politicians